Kenneth P. Brown Jr. is an American author. He served as president of the Alexis de Tocqueville Institution (AdTI), a former think tank that was based in Arlington, Virginia.

He is best known for authoring reports making accusations about Linux and open source software, notably writing the book Samizdat. Some allegations in Brown's articles were refuted by Microsoft and Andrew Tanenbaum.

Activities
As AdTI's President, Brown oversaw the Institution's policy studies and foundation relationships. He is also Vice-President of the Emerging Markets Group, an overseas market investment and advisory firm. Kenneth Brown also serves on the Board of Directors of the Democratic Century Fund.

Brown has a B.A. in English Literature from George Mason University.

Articles
“One Year Makes the Difference in Access Debate”, Multichannel News, May 1, 2000.
“The Internet Privacy Debate”, International Journal of Communications and Law Policy, March 8, 2001. 
“Outsourcing and The Devaluation of Intellectual Property”, Darwinmag.com, (April 26, 2004) 
“Samizdat: And Other Issues Regarding the 'Source' of Open Source Code”, May 20, 2004.

Notes

External links
 Kenneth Brown, B.A. (biography, International Journal of Communications Law and Policy)
Andrew Tanenbaum, "Ken Brown's Motivation, Release 1.2", Linuxtoday, May 22, 2004.
Andrew Tanenbaum, "Some Notes on the 'Who Wrote Linux' Kerfuffle, Release 1.1", Linuxtoday, May 20, 2004.
Andrew Tanenbaum, "Some Notes on the 'Who wrote Linux' Kerfuffle, Release 1.5", Original article by Andrew Tanenbaum, May 20, 2004.

American technology writers
Year of birth missing (living people)
Living people